The  is a national expressway in the Shikoku region of Japan. The expressway is numbered E32 between Kawanoe Junction and Kōchi Interchange and E56 between Kōchi and Kuroshio-Ōgata Interchanges under the MLIT's "2016 Proposal for Realization of Expressway Numbering.

Overview 
The first section of the expressway was opened to traffic in 1992. As of March 2008 the expressway incomplete in many areas. The next section is scheduled to open in 2009 (Susaki-Higashi Interchange to Shinshōgawa-bashi East Interchange). After this, all future sections will be built according to the New Direct Control System, whereby the burden for construction costs will be shared by the national and local governments and no tolls will be collected. Currently the section between Susaki-Higashi Interchange and Kuroshio-Ōgata Interchange operates according to this principle.

The expressway is 4 lanes from Kawanoe Junction to Kōchi Interchange, and 2 lanes for all remaining sections.

List of interchanges and features

 IC - interchange, SIC - smart interchange, JCT - junction, SA - service area, PA - parking area, BS - bus stop, TN - tunnel, TB - toll gate

The expressway is a direct extension of the Takamatsu Expressway.
{|table class="wikitable"
|-
!style="border-bottom:3px solid green;"|No.
!style="border-bottom:3px solid green;"|Name
!style="border-bottom:3px solid green;"|Connections
!style="border-bottom:3px solid green;"|Dist. fromOrigin
!style="border-bottom:3px solid green;"|Bus Stop
!style="border-bottom:3px solid green;"|Notes
!colspan="2" style="border-bottom:3px solid green;"|Location
|-
! style="background:#bfb;"|6
|Kawanoe JCT
| Takamatsu Expressway Matsuyama Expressway
|style="text-align:right;"|56.8
|style="text-align:center;"|
|
|rowspan="4"|Shikokuchūō
|rowspan="4" style="width:1em;"|Ehime
|-
! style="background:#bfb;"|7
|Kawanoe-Higashi JCT
| Tokushima Expressway
|style="text-align:right;"|59.2
|style="text-align:center;"|
|
|-
! style="background:#bfb;"|8
|Shingū IC
|Pref. Route 5 (Kawanoe Ōtoyo Route)
|style="text-align:right;"|67.8
|style="text-align:center;"|
|
|-
!style="background:#bfb;"|PA
|Umatate PA
|style="background-color:#ffdddd;"|
|style="background-color:#ffdddd; text-align:right;"|69.5
|style="background-color:#ffdddd; text-align:center;"|
|style="background-color:#ffdddd;"|Kawanoe-bound only
|-
!style="background:#bfb;"|PA
|Tachikawa PA
|style="background-color:#ffdddd;"|
|style="background-color:#ffdddd; text-align:right;"|80.5
|style="background-color:#ffdddd; text-align:center;"|
|style="background-color:#ffdddd;"|Kōchi-bound only
|rowspan="2"|Ōtoyo
|rowspan="17" style="width:1em;"|Kōchi
|-
! style="background:#bfb;"|9
|Ōtoyo IC/BS
| National Route 439
|style="text-align:right;"|86.0
|style="text-align:center;"|○
|
|-
! style="background:#bfb;"|10
|Nankoku IC
| National Route 32
|style="text-align:right;"|107.0
|style="text-align:center;"|
|
|rowspan="2"|Nankoku
|-
!style="background-color:#BFB;"|SA
|Nankoku SA
|
|style="text-align:right;"|109.7
|style="text-align:center;"|
|
|-
!rowspan="2" style="background-color: #BFB;"|11
|style="background-color:#ffdead;"|Kōchi JCT
|style="background-color:#ffdead;"| Kōchi-Tōbu Expressway
|rowspan="2" style="text-align:right; "|114.7
|style="background-color:#ffdead; text-align:center;"|
|style="background-color:#ffdead;"|Expected to open in 2020
|rowspan="2"|Kōchi
|-
|Kōchi IC
|Pref. Route 44 (Kōchi Kita Kanjō Route)
|
|
|-
! style="background:#bfb;"|12
|Ino IC
| National Route 33 (Kōchi-Nishi Bypass)
|style="text-align:right;"|125.0
|style="text-align:center;"|
|
|Ino
|-
! style="background:#bfb;"|13
|Tosa IC
| National Route 56 (Tosa-shi Bypass)
|style="text-align:right;"|134.0
|style="text-align:center;"|
|
|rowspan="2"|Tosa
|-
!style="background-color:#BFB;"|13-1
|Tosa PA/SIC
|
|style="text-align:right;"|139.5
|style="text-align:center;"|
|SIC: Kōchi-boundOpen 06:00-22:00
|-
!style="background-color: #BFB;"|TB
|Susaki-Higashi TB
|style="background-color:#dcdcfe;"|
|style="background-color:#dcdcfe; text-align:right; "|148.5
|style="background-color:#dcdcfe;"|
|style="background-color:#dcdcfe;"|
|rowspan="5"|Susaki
|-
! style="background:#bfb;"|14
|Susaki-Higashi IC
|style="background-color:#ffdddd;"| National Route 56
|style="background-color:#ffdddd; text-align:right;"|148.9
|style="background-color:#ffdddd; text-align:center;"|
|style="background-color:#ffdddd;"|Kuroshio-bound exit, Kōchi-bound entrance only
|-
! style="background:#bfb;"|15
|Susaki-Chūō IC
|style="background-color:#ffdddd;"| National Route 56Pref. Route 310 (Susaki Teishajō Route)
|style="background-color:#ffdddd; text-align:right;"|152.2
|style="background-color:#ffdddd; text-align:center;"|
|style="background-color:#ffdddd;"|Kuroshio-bound exit, Kōchi-bound entrance only
|-
!style="background-color: #BFB;"|
|style="background-color:#CCC;"|Shinshōgawa-bashi East Temporary Interchange
|style="background-color:#CCC;"| National Route 56
|style="background-color:#CCC; text-align:right; "|153.4
|style="background-color:#CCC; text-align:center; "|
|style="background-color:#CCC;"|abandoned on March 5, 2011
|-
! style="background:#bfb;"|16
|Susaki-Nishi IC
| National Route 56
|style="text-align:right;"|153.8
|style="text-align:center;"|
|
|-
! style="background:#bfb;"|17
|Nakatosa IC
| National Route 56
|style="text-align:right;"|160.6
|style="text-align:center;"|
|
|Nakatosa
|-
! style="background:#bfb;"|18
|Shimantochō-Higashi IC
|style="background-color:#ffdddd;"|Pref. Route 387 (Shimantochō-Higashi Inter Route)
|style="background-color:#ffdddd; text-align:right;"|169.2
|style="background-color:#ffdddd; text-align:center;"|
|style="background-color:#ffdddd;"|Kuroshio-bound exit, Kōchi-bound entrance only
|rowspan="2"|Shimanto
|-
!style="background-color:#BFB;"|19
|Shimantochō-Chūō IC
| National Route 56
|style="text-align:right;"|175.3
|style="text-align:center;"|
|
|-
|-
|colspan="8" style="text-align:center; background-color:#ffdead;"|Planned routeThrough to  National Route 56
|-
! style="background:#bfb;"|20
|Shimantochō-Nishi IC
|style="background-color:#ffdddd;"| National Route 56
|style="background-color:#ffdddd; text-align:right;"|180.7
|style="background-color:#ffdddd; text-align:center;"|
|style="background-color:#ffdddd;"|Shimanto-bound exit, Kuroshio-bound entrance only
|Shimanto
|rowspan="5" style="width:1em;"|Kōchi
|-
! style="background:#bfb;"|21
|Kuroshio-Okobushinokawa IC
|style="background-color:#ffdddd;"| National Route 56
|style="background-color:#ffdddd; text-align:right;"|186.3
|style="background-color:#ffdddd; text-align:center;"|
|style="background-color:#ffdddd;"|Shimanto-bound entrance only
|rowspan="5"|Kuroshio
|-
!style="background-color: #BFB;"|
|style="background-color:#ffdead;"|Kuroshio-Saga IC
|style="background-color:#ffdead;"| National Route 56
|style="background-color:#ffdead; text-align:right; "|192.5
|style="background-color:#ffdead; text-align:center; "|
|style="background-color:#ffdead;"|Planned
|-
!style="background-color: #BFB;"|
|style="background-color:#ffdead;"|Kuroshio-Kamikawaguchi IC
|style="background-color:#ffdead;"|Pref. Route 55 (Ōgata Taishō Route)
|style="background-color:#ffdead; text-align:right; "|200.3
|style="background-color:#ffdead; text-align:center; "|
|style="background-color:#ffdead;"|Planned
|-
!style="background-color: #BFB;"|
|style="background-color:#ffdead;"|Kuroshio-Ōgata IC
|style="background-color:#ffdead;"| National Route 56
|style="background-color:#ffdead; text-align:right; "|206.5
|style="background-color:#ffdead; text-align:center; "|
|style="background-color:#ffdead;"|Planned
|-
|colspan="8" style="text-align:center;"|Through to   Nakamura Sukumo Road

References

External links 
 West Nippon Expressway Company

Expressways in Japan
Roads in Ehime Prefecture
Roads in Kōchi Prefecture